Frances Winifred Done, CBE, FCA (née Bishop; born 6 May 1950) is a British public administrator, accountant and former local politician.

Early life 
She was born in Bristol on 6 May 1950, one of the four daughters of the Labour politician Edward Stanley Bishop, Baron Bishopston, PC, JP (1920–1984), and his wife, Winifred Mary, née Bryant, JP.

Career 
Done was educated at the University of Manchester, graduating with a Bachelor of Arts degree (BA) in economics in 1971; she then began training as an accountant at KPMG. In 1976, she was appointed a Fellow of the Institute of Chartered Accountants in England and Wales. In 1988, she returned to KPMG as a senior manager in their public sector department, but in 1991 became Treasurer of the Rochdale Metropolitan Borough Council, serving until 1998 when she became Chief Executive. In 2000, she became Chief Executive of Manchester 2002, which was responsible for organising that city's Commonwealth Games. When that role expired in 2003, she became managing director for Local Government, Housing and Criminal Justice at the Audit Commission (2003–06), which made her ultimately responsible for the commission's inspections of local government organisations. She then spent a year as Interim Director-General of the Royal British Legion for the year 2006–07. She was then Chairman of the Youth Justice Board from 2008 to 2014, and has served as a Trustee of the Canal and River Trust (formerly the Waterways Trust) since 2003. In 2015, the Department for Communities and Local Government appointed her vice-chairman of the Birmingham Improvement Panel.

Honours 
In the 2003 New Year Honours, Done was appointed a Commander of the Order of the British Empire "for services to the XVII Commonwealth Games".

Personal life 
In 1981, she married the political broadcaster Jim Hancock and has two sons.

References 

1950 births
Living people
Alumni of the University of Manchester
Commanders of the Order of the British Empire
English accountants
Daughters of life peers
KPMG people
Politicians from Bristol
Labour Party (UK) parliamentary candidates